Cheshmeh Sefid-e Sofla (also Romanized as Cheshmeh Sefīd-e Soflá; also known as Cheshmeh Sefīd) is a village in Kakavand-e Sharqi Rural District, Kakavand District, Delfan County, Lorestan Province, Iran. At the 2006 census, its population was 62, in 12 families.

References 

Towns and villages in Delfan County